The 1936 Tour de France was the 30th edition of the Tour de France, taking place from 7 July to 2 August. Because of health problems, Henri Desgrange stopped as Tour director, and was succeeded by Jacques Goddet.

The race was won by Belgian cyclist Sylvère Maes. In the early stages, he battled with French Maurice Archambaud, until Archambaud lost many minutes on the eighth stage. Maes was then able to create a large margin with his new closest competitor Magne and teammate Vervaecke.

The team classification was won by the Belgian team, and Spanish cyclist Julián Berrendero won the mountains classification. There was also a one-time classification, based on points, that was won by Sylvère Maes.

Innovations and changes

For the first time, a stage was divided into three parts.
The race director at the start of the race was still Henri Desgrange, who had been race director since the first Tour de France in 1903. Desgrange, who was already 71 years old, had had kidney surgery weeks before the start of the Tour, but was determined to follow the Tour, and rode in a car full of cushions. After the second stage, he stopped, and made Jacques Goddet director. The individuals category which had been used in 1935 was not used in 1936.

The introduction of the summer holiday in France in 1936 meant that the number of spectators on the roadside increased.

The bonification system was the same as in 1935. This meant that the winner of a stage received 90 seconds, and the second cyclist 45 seconds. In addition, the winner received a bonification equal to the margin between him and the second cyclist, with a maximum of 2 minutes. The last bonification system was also used for the first cyclist to reach a mountain top that counted for the mountains classification.

Teams

The riders were divided into two categories: the national teams and the touriste-routiers. There were four big national teams with 10 cyclists each: the Belgian team, the German team, the Spanish/Luxembourgian team and the French team. There were also five small teams of 4 cyclists each: the Swiss team, the Dutch team, the Yugoslavian team, the Romanian team and the Austrian team. For the Dutch, Yugoslavian and Romanian teams, it was the first participation ever. The Italian team was absent for political reasons (the Second Italo-Abyssinian War). An Italian team consisting of Italians living in France had been allowed to the race and even had jersey numbers designated, but finally the Tour organisers changed their minds.

The teams entering the race were:

 Belgium
 Germany
 Spain/Luxembourg
 France
 Switzerland
 Netherlands
 Yugoslavia
 Romania
 Austria

Route and stages

Stages 13b, 14b, 18b, 19b and 20b were all run in the team-time-trial format.

Race overview

Swiss Paul Egli won the first stage, and thereby became the first Swiss cyclist to lead the general classification in the Tour de France. That first stage was run in terrible rain. In the second stage, the cyclists were split in two parts, and Egli was in the second part. Archambaud then took over the lead. Archambaud lost it to Luxembourgian Mersch in the next stage, but recaptured the lead when he won the fourth stage.

The competition really started in the mountains of the seventh stage. Belgian Romain Maes, the winner of the 1935 Tour, was first over the first mountain, but then gave up, a victim of chronic bronchitis. On the next climb, Georges Speicher, winner of the 1930 Tour, gave up. Archambaud was still in the lead after that stage. The stage was won by Theo Middelkamp, who became the first Dutch cyclist to win a Tour stage. Before the 1936 Tour, Middelkamp had never seen a mountain in his life.

In the eighth stage, Archambaud could not follow anymore, and Sylvère Maes took over the lead. In third place was Antonin Magne, who had a good chance to win the race.
Magne attacked on the next stage, but could not drop Maes. Later, Magne had to let the leading group get away, and lost a minute to Maes.

The stages between the Alps and the Pyrenees were partly run as team time trials. The Belgian team was superior here, and Magne lost more time. When it was time for the Pyrenees, he was eight minutes behind Maes.

In stage 15, the podium did not change, so it had to happen in stage 16, the last mountain stage. Magne attacked, but was unable to win back time. Maes was better, and including time bonuses Maes won eighteen minutes on Magne in that stage.

In that stage, Belgian Félicien Vervaecke had borrowed a bicycle with derailleur. It was allowed for touriste-routiers, but not for national team members, and he was fined with ten minutes penalty time in the general classification. Magne also got 10 minutes penalty time, for having received food when it was not allowed. Due to this penalty, Vervaecke lost his second place in the general classification, which Magne took over.

In the last part of the race, Maes extended his lead thanks to the team time trials, although the French team was finally also able to win one.

Classification leadership and minor prizes

The time that each cyclist required to finish each stage was recorded, and these times were added together for the general classification. If a cyclist had received a time bonus, it was subtracted from this total; all time penalties were added to this total. The cyclist with the least accumulated time was the race leader, identified by the yellow jersey.

For the mountain classification, 16 mountains were selected by the Tour organisation. On the top of these mountains, ten points were given for the first cyclist to pass, nine points to the second cyclist, and so on, until the tenth cyclist who got one point.

There was also a points classification, for which the winner received 100.000 French Francs.

The team classification was calculated in 1936 by adding up the times of the best three cyclists of a team; the team with the least time was the winner. The other teams that started the race, the German, Swiss, Yugoslavian, Romanian and Austrian teams, did not finish with the minimum three cyclists to be eligible for the team classification.

Final standings

General classification

Mountains classification

Classification for 100.000 francs

Team classification

Aftermath
The stage victory of the Dutch team convinced the Tour organisation to invite them in 1937 again.

Notes

References

Bibliography

External links

 
1936 in road cycling
1936 in French sport
1936
July 1936 sports events
August 1936 sports events